Toivo Veikko Vepa Lavi (23 April 1912, in Kotka – 22 May 1996, in Hamina) was a Finnish singer, songwriter and author. Lavi made his first album in the early 1950s and became popular again in the late 1960s. His best known hit was perhaps Jokainen ihminen on laulun arvoinen (1976). Lavi was a prolific songwriter, renowned performer and socially active until his death.

Discography 
 Veikko Lavi 1 (1969)
 Veikko Lavi 2 (1971)
 Uusia lauluja (1974)
 Jokainen ihminen on laulun arvoinen (1976)
 Huumoria tunteella (1978)
 Lauluja elämästä (1979)
 Ruusuja ja risuja (1980)
 Ihminen - homo sapiens (1982)
 Monta ovea olen avannut (1983)
 Elämäni kronikka (1988)
 Tunnen kuuluvani tähän maahan (1992)
 Päivä kerrallaan (1994)

Collections 
 Veikko Lavi (1970)
 Unohtumattomat (1979)
 Lauluntekijä (1982)
 28 tunnetuinta (1988)
 Veikko Lavi (1988)
 Laulajan testamentti (1991)
 Unohtumattomat (1993)
 20 suosikkia – Jokainen ihminen on laulun arvoinen (1996)
 Parhaat (1998)
 Veikko Lavi muistoissamme / Valitut palat (1999)
 20 suosikkia – Kotkan Kerttu (2002)
 Hitit (2004)
 Nostalgia (2006)
 Veikko Lavi 1950–1952 Vol 1. (2008)
 Varis ja valtion varatyömies (2009)

Songwriter 
 Punaiset ja valkoiset (1980)
 Ystävät ja viholliset (1985)
 Syylliset ja syyttömät (1987)
 Jukka Poika: Laulajan testamentti (2008)

1912 births
1996 deaths
People from Kotka
People from Viipuri Province (Grand Duchy of Finland)
20th-century Finnish male singers
Finnish songwriters
Finnish military personnel of World War II